J. P. Dalton is a Gaelic footballer from County Wicklow, Ireland. He plays Gaelic football with his local club Kiltegan and has been a member of the Wicklow senior panel since 2005.

References

External links
 gaainfo.com

1984 births
Living people
Wicklow inter-county Gaelic footballers